Marijon Ancich (b. unk., d. December 8, 2018) was a former California high school football coach. Known as the "John Wooden of (American) high school coaches" and often called the Dean of high school coaches, he is the second-winningest high school football coach in California history with a record of 360-134-4, behind Bob Ladouceur of De La Salle High School with 399 wins. In his long career, Ancich's teams won three CIF titles, two California State titles and 19 league championships.

Personal life
Born in Yugoslavia, Marijon Ancich and his family fled to the United States during World War II. Initially arriving in New York City, the Ancich family settled in Southern California seven years later. He attended San Pedro High School, graduating in 1955. He then attended Cal Poly, San Luis Obispo and was a four-year letterman in football and a two-year letterman in track.  In football, he played fullback, linebacker, and defensive back, and was a two-time All-CCAA selection. Ancich and his wife Jacquie have seven children.

Coach Ancich is known for his unflagging work ethic - beyond coaching for over 45 years, he just retired from his other job. He was a longshoreman for 49 years, a career that was a product of his Croatian heritage and the community of San Pedro.  His coaches were told that their free time was between midnight and 6:00 am and that any normal human did not need more than a few hours of sleep each night.  His nickname of "Red-Eye" is a testament to this practice coupled with hours of watching film.  Players often referred to him as just "The Eye" because he seemed to know what any given player was doing on any given play.  He always gives credit to the parents, players, and fellow coaches for his accomplishments - he demanded a great deal of everyone and had the charisma to make everyone believe in what they were trying to do.

In late 2000, Ancich summed up his objective for every player: "To give the young man the opportunity to develop his courage, his loyalty, his poise, the proper weighing of values and the proper control of his emotions in adversity, and in accomplishment."

Coaching career

Saint Paul High School
In 1959, after college, Ancich started as an assistant coach at St. Paul High School. After being named head coach two years later, he coached at St. Paul from 1961 to 1981 and again from 1993 to 2005, before returning for a third stint in 2009.

Northern Arizona University
Offensive Coordinator, 1982

Tustin High School
From 1984 to 1992, the Tustin High School Tillers under Ancich won four league titles and reached the playoffs seven times.  They reached the CIF championship game for two consecutive seasons (1990 and 1991), losing both.  The two year combined record was 25-3.

Cerritos College
Defensive Coordinator 2005-2006.

Controversy
In 2010, Coach Ancich and other members of his staff were placed on an administrative leave after a hazing scandal that allegedly victimized several players at St. Paul High School.

On August 19, 2010, almost the entire football coaching staff at St. Paul, including Ancich, had been suspended by the school for more than a week while it and the Archdiocese of Los Angeles investigated a hazing incident.

The team had been coached in the interim by offensive coordinator Visko Ancich – Marijon's son – and defensive backs coach Rich Avina Jr., who were among those originally suspended but cleared and reinstated. Suspensions for the rest of the coaches lasted eight days while the investigation was going on.

The incident took place on Aug. 14 in the locker room. According to a letter from principal Kate Aceves, Marijon and Visko Ancich, Avina, Lou Cabral, Oliver Cepeida, Rich Estrella and Anthony Wilson were "not found culpable of any knowledge of the incident."

One coach was not reinstated, and it was reported that it was believed to be Juan Gonzalez, who had coached freshmen for four seasons and was promoted to varsity for 2010. Aceves said that one coach's contract was not renewed "because of a personnel issue." She did confirm that an incident took place, but didn't expand, other than to say the majority of the football team "had some sort of involvement whether as a witness or participant."

Championship games
1968 St. Paul faced El Rancho in the 4A finale in 1968. El Rancho was held to a 20-20 tie by upstart St. Paul, coached by a young man named Marijon Ancich. That game, also played at the Coliseum, put the St. Paul football program on the map. CIF rules at the time did not permit an overtime period, and the Dons and Swordsmen went into the record books as AAAA co-state champions.
1972 St. Paul, which had lost to Bishop Amat 19-6 in a hotly contested game in 1971, came back in 1972 to return the favor and went all the way to the 4A title game. St. Paul beat Western 29-24 at the Coliseum for Ancich's first undisputed state championship.
1975 St. Paul returned to the 4A title game at the Coliseum in 1975 - its third title-game appearance in eight years - but the Swordsmen lost a 14-13 heartbreaker to Loyola on a missed extra-point late in the 4th quarter.
1977 St.Paul survives a sudden death tie breaker vs. South Hills in the quarterfinals en route to the finals where they came up short vs. Los Altos 15-22.
1981 The Swordsmen won the Big Five Section title in 1981 with a 30-9 victory over Colton in front of 29,728 fans at Anaheim Stadium.  The team goes 14-0.
1990 Ancich gets Tustin High School into the championship game for Div. VI, bringing in a record of 13-0. This is the first time since 1933 that the Tillers have reached Game 14. They lost to Sunny Hills 7-3, giving Coach Devaney his 100th victory in front of 11,000 at Orange Coast College. An unprecedented 7 players receive First Team All-CIF awards.
1991 The Tillers reach the championship game for the second straight year, after returning only 2 starters from the previous season. They lose again, this time to Coach Marrujo's Valencia Tigers.
1998 In the Southern Section Division III championship game, Hart High School intercepted a pass on their own five-yard line with 21 seconds left to preserve a 17-14 victory against St. Paul. Hart was led by eventual Cal Berkeley and NFL quarterback Kyle Boller.

Final Game
On Saturday, June 23, 2012, Coach Marijon Ancich was at the helm for his last football game as a coach representing St. Paul High School. Ancich was chosen to coach in the 2nd annual Arizona vs. Southern California All-Star Game in Surprise, Arizona.

The Coaches' Coach
Many of Ancich's former players and assistants have become coaches or head coaches, from high school football to College to the National Football League,  including Jeff Veeder, Kurt Westling of Aliso Niguel High School in Aliso Viejo, Dick Bruich of Fontana Kaiser High School, Frank Mazzotta of La Habra High School, Robert Oviedo of Wilson High School in Hacienda Heights, Pat Degnan of Quartz Hill High School, Dusan Ancich (son) of Villa Park High School, Visko Ancich (son) of Whittier High School, Richard Smith of the NFL Houston Texans, Tim Lins of Moorpark High School, and former Cal State Northridge and Temescal Canyon High School coach Bob Burt. A "Family Tree" printed in the St. Paul program lists 116 coaches who either played or coached for Ancich.

Personal life and death
Marijon Ancich suffered a stroke on November 29, 2018, and was transferred to hospice care. He died on December 8, 2018.

See also
 Bob Ladouceur
 Bruce Rollinson

References

High school football coaches in California
American football fullbacks
American football linebackers
American football defensive backs
Cal Poly Mustangs football players
2018 deaths
Year of birth missing
Players of American football from Los Angeles
Yugoslav emigrants to the United States
Coaches of American football from California
American people of Croatian descent
Northern Arizona Lumberjacks football coaches
Cerritos Falcons football
Azusa Pacific University alumni
Sports coaches from Los Angeles